

Neil D. Jones (born 22 March 1941 in Centralia, Illinois, USA) is an American computer scientist. He is currently Professor Emeritus in computer science at University of Copenhagen.

His work spans both programming languages and the theory of computation. Within programming languages he is particularly known for his work on partial evaluation and for pioneering work within both data-flow analysis, control-flow analysis and termination analysis.
Within the theory of computation, he was among the pioneers of the study of Log-space reductions and P-completeness.

Neil D. Jones is Knight of the Order of the Dannebrog (since 1998) and also a member of the Academia Europaea (since 1999). He is a 1998 Fellow of the Association for Computing Machinery for "outstanding contributions to semantics-directed compilation, especially partial evaluation, and to the theory of computation, formal models and their practical realization".

External links 
 Home page
 Biographical information

Selected publications 
 Neil D. Jones, Carsten K. Gomard, and Peter Sestoft: Partial Evaluation and Automatic Program Generation (1993) Book, full text available online.
 Neil D. Jones, Computability and Complexity from a Programming Perspective (1997) Book, published by MIT Press, online text is a revised and corrected version.

References 

Danish knights
Fellows of the Association for Computing Machinery
Members of Academia Europaea
1941 births
Living people